Gowrisankaram is a 2003 Indian Malayalam-language romance film directed by Nemom Pushparaj and written by Madambu Kunjukuttan, starring Munna and Kavya Madhavan as two long-lost childhood sweethearts. This is also one of the final films of Narendra Prasad.

Cast
Kavya Madhavan as Gowri
Munna as Sankaran
 Mithun Ramesh as Gowri's brother
Narendra Prasad
Oduvil Unnikrishnan
Aranmula Ponnamma
Urmila Unni

Soundtrack
Music: M. Jayachandran, Lyrics: Gireesh Puthenchery.

 "Kannil Kannil" (D) - P. Jayachandran, K. S. Chitra
 "Kannil Kannil" (F) - K. S. Chitra
 "Krishna Bolo" (D) - Madhu Balakrishnan, Abitha
 "Paalkkadalil Pallikollum" (D) - P. Jayachandran, K. S. Chitra
 "Thiriyeriyunna" (M) - K. J. Yesudas
 "Urangaathe" (D) - P. Jayachandran, K. S. Chitra
 "Urangaathe" (M) - P. Jayachandran

References

External links
 

2000s Malayalam-language films
2000s romance films
Indian romance films
Films scored by M. Jayachandran